Monica Beatrice McKenzie (23 October 1905–5 December 1988) was a New Zealand teacher, dietitian and public servant. She was born in Wellington, Wellington, New Zealand on 23 October 1905.

References

1905 births
1988 deaths
New Zealand educators
New Zealand public servants
People from Wellington City